Ahmad Amsyar bin Azman (born 28 August 1992) is a Malaysian diver. Azman was in 12th place in the preliminary round of the 3m springboard within the 2016 Olympic Games, but after his dive went wrong, he was knocked out of the contest.

References

External links
 
 
 
 
 
 
 

1992 births
Living people
People from Perlis
Malaysian people of Malay descent
Malaysian Muslims
Malaysian male divers
Olympic divers of Malaysia
Divers at the 2016 Summer Olympics
Divers at the 2010 Commonwealth Games
Divers at the 2014 Commonwealth Games
Divers at the 2018 Commonwealth Games
Commonwealth Games competitors for Malaysia
Divers at the 2014 Asian Games
Asian Games silver medalists for Malaysia
Asian Games medalists in diving
Southeast Asian Games gold medalists for Malaysia
Southeast Asian Games silver medalists for Malaysia
Southeast Asian Games bronze medalists for Malaysia
Southeast Asian Games medalists in diving
Divers at the 2018 Asian Games
Medalists at the 2014 Asian Games
Competitors at the 2011 Southeast Asian Games
Competitors at the 2013 Southeast Asian Games
Competitors at the 2015 Southeast Asian Games
Competitors at the 2017 Southeast Asian Games
21st-century Malaysian people